Show of Strength may refer to:
 MDA Show of Strength, the current name of the former Jerry Lewis MDA Labor Day Telethon
 Show of Strength Theatre Company, Bristol, England